The Åkviksundet Bridge is a box girder bridge that crosses the Åkviksundet strait between the islands of Dønna and Staulen in Nordland county, Norway. Together with the Hoholmen Bridge, it forms the road connection between the municipalities of Herøy and Dønna. Jan-Eirik Nilsskog was the main engineer that built the bridge. The Åkviksundet Bridge was opened by King Harald V on 19 June 1999.

See also
List of bridges in Norway
List of bridges in Norway by length
List of bridges
List of bridges by length

References

Herøy, Nordland
Dønna
Road bridges in Nordland
Bridges completed in 1999
1999 establishments in Norway